Huginaspis is an extinct genus of placoderm fish, which lived during the Middle Devonian period of Spitsbergen, Norway.

References

Placoderms of Europe
Phlyctaeniidae